Charles Stourton may refer to:
Charles Stourton, 8th Baron Stourton (c. 1520–1557), English peer
Charles Stourton, 15th Baron Stourton (1702–1753), English peer
Charles Stourton, 17th Baron Stourton (1752–1816), English peer
Charles Langdale (born Charles Stourton; 1787–1868), English politician and leading Roman Catholic layman during the 19th century
Charles Stourton, 19th Baron Stourton (1802–1872), English peer
Charles Stourton, 24th Baron Mowbray (1867–1936), English peer
Charles Stourton, 26th Baron Mowbray (1923–2006), English peer and politician